Founded in 1991, Theatre at the Center is a year-round professional theatre in Munster, Indiana. They bring a performing arts series, a children's theatre program, and serve as hosts for special programs that enhance cultural opportunities in Northwest Indiana. As part of the Ridgewood Arts Foundation, a 501(c)(3) not-for-profit company, it is Northwest Indiana's only professional equity theatre and is located 35 minutes from downtown Chicago.

The mission of Ridgewood Arts Foundation, Inc.’s Theatre at the Center is to fund the many worthy artistic endeavors within and near the Village of Ridgewood. This will enable us to encourage the further development of the arts within the community. These disciplines of the performing arts aim to be appealing, educational, and accessible to the entire community.

Theatre at the Center's main stage season offers five productions annually.  Many of Theatre at the Center's productions have been recommended by the Jeff Awards, celebrating excellence in Chicago theatre.

Theatre at the Center additionally offers Theatre for Young Audiences programming, presenting four productions annually.

Artistic Director

William Pullinsi was the founder and artistic director of Candlelight Playhouse, America's first dinner theatre which opened in Washington, D.C. in 1959 and Summit, Illinois in 1961. He is widely credited with introducing theatre to hundreds and thousands of patrons who otherwise might not have attended live theatrical productions. Pullinsi is recognized as a master director among theatre professionals internationally and nationally for staging the American musical.

Pullinsi has served as the artistic director at Theatre at the Center since 2005. He has directed and produced more than 400 shows in his career receiving 18 Jeff Awards. Pullinsi produced numerous shows that became part of Chicago's rich theatrical history due to their record-breaking multi-year runs including Fiddler on the Roof, Man of La Mancha, and Little Shop of Horrors, which transferred to the Royal George Theatre. Pullinsi is well known for his high production values and creative staging.

Highlights of his career include the purchasing of the Broadway set of Company from Hal Prince; the off Broadway plants for Little Shop of Horrors; and the Tony Award-winning costumes from Nine. Not one to rest on commercial hits alone, Pullinsi opened the Forum Theatre in 1970 to present deeper and more thought-provoking theatre including The National Health, Robert and Elizabeth and the world premiere of Boss. Additionally, at Candlelight, he took chances on musicals that were considered to be artistic or commercial flops and turned them into major successes such as Follies, Song & Dance and Rags.

Shows for which he received both best production and best direction awards include: Follies, Into the Woods, Phantom, Little Shop of Horrors, Nine, The National Health and Man of La Mancha. He directed Into the Woods at Marriott's Lincolnshire Theatre and the long running play, Over the Tavern at Northlight Theatre and the Mercury Theatre. He served as associate producer of Trying, a new play off Broadway in New York. Pullinsi received his B.F.A. from Boston Conservatory, did graduate work at the Goodman School and received the honorary degree of doctor of humanities from Lewis University. He was named a distinguished artist in the theatre by the Chicago Academy of Arts and also by the Chicago Drama League.

In 1989, Pullinsi became the first American director to stage a musical in Russia with a Soviet cast and crew. He directed Man of La Mancha during a five-week visit to the Drama Theatre of Turgenev in Orel, south of Moscow. Pullinsi is a lifelong member of the Actors' Equity Association and a member of the Society of Stage Directors and Choreographers.

General Manager

In 2011, Theatre at the Center announced the appointment of Richard Friedman as general manager.

Friedman had served as managing director of Northlight Theatre for nine years. During that time, the theatre established their first permanent home at the North Shore Center for the Performing Arts, boosting subscriptions from 3,000 to 9,000 patrons. Under Friedman's management, the budget grew from $800,000 to $2.9 million. He has produced commercial shows including Always...Patsy Cline at the Apollo Theater Chicago, The Guys at the Lakeshore Theater featuring Jeremy Piven, Joan Cusack and Daniel J. Travanti and Jim Post's Heart of Christmas also at the Lakeshore Theatre.

Friedman has consulted on performing arts management with companies including Deeply Rooted Dance Theatre and Mordine and Company Dance.  He served as the executive director of Arts Resources and Teaching (A.R.T.), as well as the managing director of Organic Theater Company.  During his time with Organic, he oversaw the renovation of the building on Clark Street. He produced shows like the revival of Bleacher Bums, directed by Joe Mantegna and Do The White Thing with Aaron Freeman and Rob Kolson.

Friedman was a founder of the Illinois Arts Alliance, chairing its first statewide conference on advocacy for the arts. He is a former member of the League of Chicago Theatres and currently serves as secretary of the board of CAN-TV, Chicago's public access cable television organization. Friedman is a co-founder and former director of Yellow Press, a literary publisher, and the author of two books of poetry. Additionally, Friedman is a recipient of the Illinois Theatre Association's Annual Award of Excellence for his work at Northlight Theatre. Friedman is a graduate of the University of Illinois at Chicago.

Recent Performances

References

External links
Theatre at the Center official website

Theatres in Indiana